Houghton Estate, often simply called Houghton is an affluent suburb of Johannesburg, South Africa, north-east of the city centre.

It is best known for being the home of Nelson Mandela.

History
Houghton was developed as a residential area around the turn of the 20th century, primarily by Johannesburg Consolidated Investment Company (JCI). The suburb was laid out by surveyor Gustav Arthur Troye.

Geography

Communities
Houghton Estate has traditionally been informally divided into two areas: Upper Houghton, and Lower Houghton. Upper Houghton is the southern and south-eastern portion located on a ridge, while the northern Lower Houghton is flatter, and has a grid street pattern, with parts on both sides of the M1 freeway. Upper Houghton has been declared a National Heritage Area.

Upper and Lower Houghton are separated by the East-West section of Houghton Drive and part of Louis Botha Avenue. Small sections of Upper Houghton lie east of Louis Botha Avenue (bordering Observatory), and west of the north–south section of Houghton Drive (bordering Parktown and Hillbrow). Houghton is surrounded by wealthy suburbs in all directions, except south, where Upper Houghton borders less-affluent suburbs like Yeoville and Hillbrow.

Architecture
Historically a wealthy area, it contains many mansions on big stands, blocks of flats, as well as office parks (developed on the sites of former homes) on streets close to the M1 and on Louis Botha Avenue. Houghton is architecturally varied. 
There are good examples of art deco buildings (particularly some of the flats), and many of the large houses in the 1930s are good examples of the Modern style inspired by the work of Le Corbusier (Chipkin 1993), including Stern House (1935) designed by Rex Distin Martienssen and partners.

The suburb, particularly Lower Houghton, is currently experiencing rapid redevelopment. Although many plots had already been subdivided in two, there is now a trend towards the development of cluster homes. This redevelopment is sanctioned by the City of Johannesburg's Regional Spatial Development Framework. The city sees many positive aspects to the redevelopment, but it is not uncontroversial and has resulted in the destruction of many traditional houses.

Demographics

Religion
As with many suburbs in the North-East of Johannesburg, Houghton  has historically been known for being a Jewish area, and has a shul known as West Street Shul.

As apartheid ended many Muslims moved to the Northern Suburbs of Johannesburg, including Houghton. A musallah was established in the east of the suburb, and, in 2011, a mosque, called Masjid ul Furqaan was built by the Houghton Muslim Association on the site of the mussalah. Another, larger mosque on West Street, visible from the M1 freeway, was, after delays, completed in 2013  by the Houghton Muslim Jamaat.

Economy

Retail
There are few shops in Houghton itself, apart from convenience stores in petrol stations, but the area is close to numerous commercial nodes in Johannesburg, including those in Oaklands, Norwood, Killarney, Rosebank and Sandton.

Parks and greenspace
Houghton has two golf courses (Houghton and Killarney) and a large public park, The Wilds (which has been described as "notorious" for muggings and crime). A large sports club, the Old Edwardian Society (known as Old Eds), which includes a separate Virgin Active gym, is in Houghton.

Education
There are a number of well known schools in Upper Houghton: King Edward VII School, a public school for boys, also known as KES), along with its associated primary school, King Edward VII Preparatory School, known as KEPS, and St John's College a private Anglican school historically only for boys, while Roedean School (South Africa), a private  girls school, is close by in Parktown. Houghton School (a public primary school) is in Lower Houghton.

Law and government

Government
Lower Houghton, and a small part of Upper Houghton, bordering Observatory, are part of Region E of the City of Johannesburg Metropolitan Municipality, and are currently (as of 2014) included in Ward 73, while most of Upper Houghton is part of Region F of the City of Johannesburg Metropolitan Municipality, and is part of Ward 67.

Politics
During the apartheid era, the Houghton constituency in the whites-only parliament was represented by opponent of apartheid Helen Suzman until 1989, and was, for a period in the 1960s, the sole seat of the Progressive Party in Parliament.

Crime
Lower Houghton is part of the SAPS Norwood Police Station precinct, while Upper Houghton is part of the Hillbrow Police Station's precinct.

Infrastructure

Roads
Houghton is centrally located, straddling the M1 freeway, with interchanges at Glenhove Road (M1 N & S), Eleventh Avenue (M1 S), Riviera Road (M1 N), 1st Avenue (M1 S) and Houghton Drive (M1 N). Multiple metropolitan routes cross Houghton, including the M16, M20, M31, R25, and M11 (Louis Botha Avenue).

The grid street pattern in Lower Houghton consists mostly of numbered Streets and Avenues on both sides of the M1. Avenues run east–west, while Streets run from north to south. Avenue counting begins in the south with First Avenue (part of Metropolitan Route M16), and ends in the North with Seventeenth Avenue, while Street counting begins in the east with 1st Street, and ends in the West at 9th Street, with the numbered grid interrupted by Central, West and River Streets. North–south streets in Upper Houghton are generally named after trees, while east–west roads are named after Christian saints.

Lower Houghton and Upper Houghton are linked by Louis Botha Avenue, Houghton Drive, and the steep and winding Munro Drive, a National Monument which has a viewpoint with a view over the northern suburbs of Johannesburg.

Public transport
Louis Botha Avenue, in the east of the suburb, is an important minibus taxi route linking Hillbrow to Alexandra, and, as of 2014, construction began on the expansion of Johannesburg's Rea Vaya bus rapid transit system to Louis Botha Avenue. A Gautrain bus feeder route (numbered RB5) runs past the office parks on West Street, linking to the Rosebank Gautrain Station.

Notable people

The most famous resident of Houghton Estate was Nelson Mandela; he died in December 2013 at his Lower Houghton home, which became a site of remembrance in the immediate aftermath of his death. His residence was on the corner of 4th Street and 12th Avenue.

References

Further reading
 C. Chipkin. Johannesburg Style: Architecture & Society 1880s-1960s. David Philip. .
 N. Musiker and R. Musiker. (2000) A Concise Historical Dictionary of Greater Johannesburg. Francolin Reference. .
 Chantelle Benjamin. "Sun sets on areas with low rates." The Weekender, 3–4 November 2007, p3.

Johannesburg Region E
Johannesburg Region F